The Philadelphia Little Flyers are a USA Hockey-sanctioned Tier III junior ice hockey team from Aston, Pennsylvania. They play in the South Conference of the Eastern Hockey League (EHL) at the IceWorks Skating Complex

The players, ages 16–20, carry amateur status under junior A guidelines and hope to earn a spot on higher levels of junior hockey in the United States and Canada, Canadian major junior, collegiate, and eventually professional teams.

History
The Little Flyers were one of the six charter members for the Atlantic Junior Hockey League (AJHL) in 2003 after previously having Tier III Junior B teams in the Metropolitan Junior Hockey League. They played in every season of the AJHL until 2013 when Tier III junior hockey leagues were reorganized and the AJHL was re-branded as the Eastern Hockey League (EHL). In 2015, the EHL added a lower level of Tier III junior hockey for player development called the EHL-Elite Division and all the current EHL members, including the Little Flyers, were added to the EHL-Premier Division. In 2017, the league re-branded again, dropping the Premier name from their top division and renamed the Elite Division to Premier.

The organization also continues to field youth hockey select teams at the Midget 16U, Bantam, Peewee, and Squirt levels. From 2003 to 2015, the Little Flyers fielded a team at the former Tier III Junior B level in the Metropolitan Junior Hockey League.

Season-by-season records

Alumni
The Little Flyers have produced a number of alumni playing in higher levels of junior hockey, NCAA Division I and III, ACHA college, and professional programs, including:
 Harry Dumas (Official) - AHL and NHL
 Ian Walsh (Official) - NHL
 Mark Eaton - Pittsburgh Penguins (NHL)
 Chris Ferraro New York Rangers 1992 NHL Entry Draft - Las Vegas Wranglers (ECHL)
 Peter Ferraro New York Rangers 1992 NHL Entry Draft - Las Vegas Wranglers (ECHL)
 Arpod Mihaly - HC Bolzano (Serie A)
 Mike Richter New York Rangers 1985 NHL Entry Draft - New York Rangers (NHL)
 Johnny Gaudreau Calgary Flames 2011 NHL Entry Draft - Calgary Flames (NHL)

References

External links
 Official Little Flyers web site
 Official League Website

Amateur ice hockey teams in Pennsylvania
2003 establishments in Pennsylvania
Ice hockey clubs established in 2003
Delaware County, Pennsylvania